The Albanian Christian Democratic Movement is a Christian-democratic political party in Albania founded by Nikollë Lesi, an MP and former member of the Demochristian Party of Albania (PDK) on 8 November 2007 over disagreements with his previous party's new party leader, Nard Ndoka. Lesi expects to at least match the PDK's performance in the 2005 election at the next election. The party had one MP in the Assembly of Albania until the 2009 Albanian parliamentary election.

References

2007 establishments in Albania
Christian democratic parties in Europe
Conservative parties in Albania
Political parties established in 2007
Political parties in Albania